Let Love Win is the debut major label studio album from Christian pop rock band the Museum. It was released on July 27, 2010 by BEC Recordings.

Track listing

References

2010 albums
BEC Recordings albums
The Museum (band) albums